Margaretania is a genus of moths of the family Crambidae. It contains only one species, Margaretania superba, which is found in Iran.

References

Natural History Museum Lepidoptera genus database

Cybalomiinae
Taxa named by Hans Georg Amsel
Monotypic moth genera
Crambidae genera